The Enterprise and Data Center Standard Form Factor or EDSFF and previously known as the Enterprise and Data Center SSD Form Factor is a family of SSD form factors for use in data centers that is being developed by the Small Form Factor Technology Affiliate technical work group, which is itself under the organizational stewardship of the Storage Networking Industry Association.

As a family of form factors, it defines specifications for the mechanical dimensions and electrical interfaces devices should have, to ensure compatibility between disparate hardware manufacturers. The standard is meant to replace the M.2 and U.2 form factors for drives used in data centers.

EDSFF SSDs are made in six sizes: E1.L (Long) and E1.S (Short), E2.L and E2.S, and E3.L and E3.S. 

Samsung's NGSFF (also known as M.3 or NF1) form factor competes with EDSFF.

See also 
 NVM Express
 PCI Express

References

External links
 Solid State Drive Form Factors on SNIA's website

Data centers
Computer-related introductions in 2017
Computer connectors